Thellar block is a revenue block in the Tiruvannamalai district of Tamil Nadu, India. It has a total of 61 panchayat villages.

References 

 

Thellar is actually of great historic importance, it is the place where the great Chola empire was destroyed. It is also the place where Nandhivarman III died and also the place where the Third carnatic war took place (battle of wandiwash) from when the French lost their power in India.

Revenue blocks in Tiruvannamalai district